Alen Krajnc (born 1 July 1995) is a Slovenian footballer who plays for Gorica as a winger.

References

External links
NZS profile 

1995 births
Living people
Slovenian footballers
Association football wingers
FC Koper players
NK Drava Ptuj (2004) players
NK Zavrč players
NK Aluminij players
ND Gorica players
Slovenian PrvaLiga players
Slovenian Second League players
Slovenia youth international footballers